Kasey Smith may refer to:
 Kasey Smith (singer), former member of Wonderland and the Irish representative in the Eurovision Song Contest 2014
 Kasey Smith, American keyboardist who was a member of Danger Danger